According to the World Wide Fund for Nature, the territory of the Czech Republic can be subdivided into four terrestrial ecoregions:

 Central European mixed forests
 Pannonian mixed forests
 Western European broadleaf forests
 Carpathian montane conifer forests

References 

Czech Republic
 
ecoregions